Lake Coorong is an eutrophic lake located in the Wimmera region of western Victoria, Australia. After more than a decade of drought, in early 2011 the lake filled as a result of flooding in the region.

In the local Aboriginal Wergaia language, the river is named Yarak, with "Yarak" representing the lake and surrounding country; and also Gurrong with the word meaning "canoe".

See also

Lakes and other water bodies of Victoria

References

Lakes of Victoria (Australia)
Mallee catchment
Rivers of Grampians (region)
Wimmera